Adella Liebenow Wotherspoon (November 28, 1903 – January 26, 2004) was the youngest and last living survivor of the General Slocum ship disaster of June 15, 1904.

Birth and siblings
Born Adele Martha Liebenow in Manhattan, she was the daughter of Anna Liebenow (1872–1957) and Paul Liebenow (1871–1910). She was nicknamed Tiby Liebenow. Her siblings Anna C. Liebenow Jr. (1901–1904) and Helen Liebenow (1898–1904) died in the fire on the PS General Slocum.  Helen's body was never identified and is presumed buried in a mass grave. Two cousins and two aunts also perished in the fire. One of the relatives who died was Martha Liebenow (1875–1904) of 404 5th Street in Manhattan. Adella's family was listed as living at 133 East 125th Street in the official register of General Slocum deaths.

Shortly after the sinking, her parents legally changed her first name to "Adella".

Fire aftermath
After the fire, Adella was treated at Lebanon Hospital. At the dedication ceremony, she pulled the rope to release the American flag and unveil the memorial to the fire victims. After her father's death in 1910, Anna moved the family to Watchung, New Jersey. Adella attended Plainfield High School, then studied education at Trenton Normal School, now known as The College of New Jersey. She taught for one year at Cleveland High School in Cranford, New Jersey then taught business administration at Plainfield High School from 1925 until 1961 when she retired. She married James Wotherspoon (1903–1982), but the couple had no children.

Commemoration
The young Wotherspoon played a highly visible role in unveiling a commemorative statue in the cemetery where more than sixty unidentified dead were buried on the first anniversary of the disaster. She returned annually for the memorial ceremonies.

Death and burial
Wotherspoon was a resident of a convalescent home in Berkeley Heights, New Jersey for the last several years of her life. She died in 2004 at aged 100, and was cremated. Her ashes were buried alongside her husband's at the Wilson Memorial Union Church Cemetery in Watchung, New Jersey.

See also

Catherine Uhlmyer, second to last survivor

References

External links
 Findagrave: Adella Wotherspoon
Adella Liebenow Wotherspoon Photographs and Papers, 1860-2004, PR 400, at the New-York Historical Society.

1903 births
2004 deaths
PS General Slocum
Plainfield High School (New Jersey) alumni
People from Manhattan
People from Plainfield, New Jersey
People from Roseland, New Jersey
People from Watchung, New Jersey
American centenarians
The College of New Jersey alumni
Shipwreck survivors
Women centenarians